The Lapland Week is a major annual conference by the Swedish Pentecostal Movement. It occurs in June–July every year in Husbondliden in Lycksele Municipality, Sweden. It was first held in 1919 as a Bible studies week.

The event is one of the larger Christian festivals in northern Sweden.

References

External links
webbplats 

1919 establishments in Sweden
July events
June events
Recurring events established in 1919
Swedish Pentecostal Movement
Västerbotten County
Evangelical Christian conferences